The 1992 North Dakota State Bison football team was an American football team that represented North Dakota State University during the 1992 NCAA Division II football season as a member of the North Central Conference. In their sixth year under head coach Rocky Hager, the team compiled a 10–2 record and finished as NCC champion.

Schedule

References

North Dakota State
North Dakota State Bison football seasons
North Central Conference football champion seasons
North Dakota State Bison football